Jani Atanasov (born 31 October 1999) is a Macedonian professional footballer who plays as a midfielder for Polish club Cracovia.

Club career
On 5 June 2018, Atanasov joined Bursaspor after successful debut season with Akademija Pandev in the Macedonian First Football League. He made his professional debut with Bursaspor in a 2–1 Süper Lig loss to Fenerbahçe on 11 August 2018.

On 8 September 2020, Atanasov was announced as a new HNK Hajduk Split player, signing a three-year contract. He arrived as a free transfer, having terminated his contract with Bursaspor, and was given the number 20 shirt.

On 23 January 2023, he was transferred to Polish club Cracovia for an undisclosed fee, signing a three-and-a-half-year contract.

International career
Having both Bulgarian and Macedonian citizenship, Atanasov was eligible for both countries. On 11 November 2021 he made his international debut for North Macedonia substituting Elif Elmas at minute '83 of the 2022 World Cup Qualifying match against Armenia, which North Macedonia won by 5-0.

References

External links
 
 
 

1999 births
Living people
Sportspeople from Strumica
Association football midfielders
Macedonian footballers
North Macedonia youth international footballers
North Macedonia under-21 international footballers
North Macedonia international footballers
Macedonian people of Bulgarian descent
Akademija Pandev players
Bursaspor footballers
HNK Hajduk Split players
MKS Cracovia (football) players
Macedonian First Football League players
Süper Lig players
Croatian Football League players
Macedonian expatriate footballers
Macedonian expatriate sportspeople in Turkey
Expatriate footballers in Turkey
Macedonian expatriate sportspeople in Croatia
Expatriate footballers in Croatia
Macedonian expatriate sportspeople in Poland
Expatriate footballers in Poland